The General Intelligence Directorate, also known as the General Security Directorate or Syrian GID, is the most important civil intelligence service of Syria and plays an important role in quelling internal dissent. The General Intelligence Directorate conducts surveillance of the Syrian population, directs foreign intelligence, and monitors activities in Lebanon.

Organization 
The General Intelligence Directorate  is under the jurisdiction of the Ministry of Interior. It is divided into three  branches:
 
Internal Security Division (Branch 251)
External Security Division
Palestinian Affairs Division

The internal security division is responsible for the internal surveillance of the population. The external security division is responsible for foreign intelligence work. And, the Palestinian division is responsible for monitoring the activities of Palestinian groups in Syria and Lebanon.

Hisham Bekhityar became the head of the General Security Directorate in 2001, replacing Ali Hammoud, who became the Minister of Interior. General Bakhtiar was close to Bashar al-Assad's deceased brother-in-law Assef Shawkat.
In the late 20th century Maj. Gen Ali Houri was director of General Security Directorate.
The service was in competition with Idarat al-Amn al-Siyasi in the late 20th century.
Gen. Ghazi Kanaan possibly headed international security of the General Security Directorate in the late 20th century.

President Bashar Assad in June 2005 appointed General Ali Mamluk as commander of the General Security Directorate. Six years later in April 2011, the US government imposed sanctions on Ali Mamluk, saying he had been responsible for human rights abuses, including the use of violence against civilians. His agency had repressed internal dissent, monitored individual citizens, and had been involved in the Syrian government's actions in Daraa, where protesters were killed by Syrian security services. The next month, the EU also imposed sanctions on Ali Mamluk, saying he had been involved in efforts to suppress anti-government protesters. A Sunni, he is said to be on good terms with all of Syria's intelligence agencies – the heads of Air Force Intelligence and the Political Security Directorate were once his assistants. He is a part of Bashar al-Assad's inner circle.

Heads of General Intelligence Directorate  
Adnan Babagh (1971–?)
Ali Madani (1970s)
Nazih Zirayr (?–1983)
Fu'ad Absi (1983–1987)
Majid Sa'id (1987–1994)
Internal branch: Mohammed Nasif Kheirbek (?–1999)
Bashir an-Najjar (1994–1998)
Ali Houri (1998–2001)
Deputy director: Mohammed Nasif Kheirbek (1999–June 2005)
Internal branch (251): Bahjat Suleiman (1999–June 2005)
External branch: Ayyad Mahmud (1999–?) 
Ali Hammoud (October–December 2001)
Hisham Ikhtiyar (2001–June 2005)
Ali Mamlouk (June 2005 – 2010), the European Union sanctioned him for "violence against demonstrators during the Syrian uprising". 
Deputy director: Hassan Khallouf  (June 2005–?)
Internal branch (251): Fouad Nasif Kheir Bek (June 2005–?) Anwar Raslan (Investigations team 2008–?)
Deputy director: Jamil Hassan (?–2009)
Information branch: Zouheir Hamad (?–July 2010)
Zouheir Hamad (July 2010–July 2012), the European Union sanctioned him for "the use of violence across Syria and for intimidation and torture of protesters during the Syrian Civil War".
Deputy director: General Nazih (?–July 2012), the European Union sanctioned him for "being responsible for the use of violence across Syria and intimidation and torture of protestors during the Syrian uprising".
Information branch: Ghassan Khalil (July 2010–present), the European Union sanctioned him for "being involved in repression and violence against the civilian population in Syria during the Syrian uprising".
Mohammed Dib Zaitoun (July 2012 – July 2019)
Deputy director: Zouheir Hamad (July 2012–present)
Internal branch (251): Tawfiq Younes (2011-2016), the European Union sanctioned him for "being involved in violence against demonstrators during the Syrian uprisings".
Hossam Mohammad Louka (July 2019 – present)

Regional Heads of General Intelligence Directorate  
Damascus branch: Hafez Makhlouf (2011), the European Union sanctioned him for "being involved in violence against demonstrators during the Syrian uprisings".
Damascus (branch 285): Brig. Gen. Ibrahim Ma’ala (2011-2012) accused of "ordering or committing crimes against humanity" by Human Rights Watch.
Damascus (branch 285): Brig. Gen. Hussam Fendi (past-2011) accused of "ordering or committing crimes against humanity".
Homs (branch 318): Brig. Gen. Firas Al-Hamed (2012) accused of "ordering or committing crimes against humanity". 
Latakia branch: Brig. Gen. Khudr Khudr (2012) accused of "ordering or committing crimes against humanity".
Daraa branch: Brig. Gen. Ahmed Dibe (2011).
Raqqa branch: Brig. Gen. Khaled Al-Halabi (2008-2013) accused of being involved with the arrest and torture of dissidents, as well as telling security forces to fire on any unauthorized gathering of more than four people.

Other Syrian intelligence agencies
Political Security Directorate
Military Intelligence Directorate
Air Force Intelligence Directorate

References 

Syrian intelligence agencies